"Sending Out An S.O.S." was a disco hit for singer Retta Young in 1975. It charted in the US and the UK where it did better. It is considered a classic Disco song.

Background
In The US, the record was released on All Platinum AP 2355. In Australia, The Netherlands and Germany it was released on the Philips label.
It debuted for the week ending May 31, 1975. It Peaked at No. 88 on the U.S. R&B charts and No. 28 in the U.K. For the week ending June 14, 1975 "Sending Out An S.O.S." was rated No.9 for The Top Audience Response In N.Y. Discos. No. 3 was "The Hustle" by Van McCoy, No. 2 was "El Bimbo" by Bimbo Jet and No. 1 was "Free Man" by South Shore Commission. Colony Records had it at No. 7 and Downstairs Records had it at No 1.

The song was also covered by South African artist Jonathan Butler and appeared as the B side of his "I'll Be Home" single which was released on the Bullet label in 1976.

References

External links
 Various releases at Discogs
 Sending out an S.O.S. - Retta Young

1975 songs
1975 singles